In physics and mathematics, the Clebsch representation of an arbitrary three-dimensional vector field  is:

Background

In fluid dynamics and plasma physics, the Clebsch representation provides a means to overcome the difficulties to describe an inviscid flow with non-zero vorticity – in the Eulerian reference frame – using Lagrangian mechanics and Hamiltonian mechanics. At the critical point of such functionals the result is the Euler equations, a set of equations describing the fluid flow. Note that the mentioned difficulties do not arise when describing the flow through a variational principle in the Lagrangian reference frame. In case of surface gravity waves, the Clebsch representation leads to a rotational-flow form of Luke's variational principle.

For the Clebsch representation to be possible, the vector field  has (locally) to be bounded, continuous and sufficiently smooth. For global applicability  has to decay fast enough towards infinity. The Clebsch decomposition is not unique, and (two) additional constraints are necessary to uniquely define the Clebsch potentials. Since  is in general not solenoidal, the Clebsch representation does not in general satisfy the Helmholtz decomposition.

Vorticity

The vorticity  is equal to

with the last step due to the vector calculus identity  So the vorticity  is perpendicular to both  and  while further the vorticity does not depend on

Notes

References

 
 
 
 
 
 
 
 
 
 
 
 
 

Vector calculus
Fluid dynamics
Plasma physics